CAV-1 and similar may refer to:
Infectious canine hepatitis, a virus disease of dogs
Caveolin 1, a human gene
Human genes that encode subunits of the slowly inactivating L-type voltage-dependent calcium channel in skeletal muscle cells:
Cav1.1
Cav1.2
Cav1.3
Cav1.4
1CAV is the 1st Cavalry Division (United States)

See also
 CAV3 (disambiguation)
 CAV2
 CAV (disambiguation)
 1st Cavalry (disambiguation)